Dafni is a metro station on Athens Metro Line 2, which opened on 15 November 2000, and was the line's terminus until 5 June 2004, when Agios Dimitrios station opened.

Art works
 Dimitris Mytaras' Dexileos is at the ticket hall level.

References

Athens Metro stations
Railway stations opened in 2000
2000 establishments in Greece